Epicaria (Ancient Greek: Ἐπικάρια) or Durnium was a settlement in ancient Illyria, of the Illyrian tribe called the Cavii. It was close to Bassania.

See also
List of ancient cities in Illyria

References

Illyrian Albania
Former populated places in the Balkans
Cities in ancient Illyria